Rollo Carpenter (born 1965) is the British-born creator of Jabberwacky and Cleverbot, learning Artificial Intelligence (AI) software. Carpenter worked as CTO of a business software startup in Silicon Valley.

Career
His brother is the artist Merlin Carpenter.

In 2005 Carpenter co-authored "Computing Machinery and the Individual: the Personal Turing Test".

He serves as managing director of Existor Ltd, a company developing AI for entertainment, companionship and communication and education. His AI entries George and Joan were #1 for Loebner Prize (2005) and (2006). 

In 2010, Carpenter won the British Computer Society's Machine Intelligence Competition.

Cleverbot 
In 2011, Cleverbot, a learning Artificial Intelligence conversationalist, took part alongside humans in a formal Turing Test at the Techniche 2011 festival at IIT Guwahati, India on 3 September. The results from 1,334 votes were announced 4 September 2011. Cleverbot was judged to be 59.3% human, far exceeding expectations. The humans in the event achieved just 63.3%.

"That is rather an amazing figure. It's higher than even I was expecting, or even, really, hoping for," said British AI scientist Rollo Carpenter during a lecture at the Techniche festival. "The figures the test exceeded 50%, and you could argue all this to mean that Cleverbot has now passed the Turing Test, here at Techniche 2011."

Carpenter says the computing power and algorithms needed to achieve full artificial intelligence will come in the next few decades. "We cannot quite know what will happen if a machine exceeds our own intelligence, so we can't know if we'll be infinitely helped by it, or ignored by it and sidelined, or conceivably destroyed by it."

Thoughtscreen 
In 2020 Carpenter created and launched a new site, Thoughtscreen, that allows people to talk to AI, and to each other, while simultaneously seeing what everyone else is saying.

Author 
In 2021 Carpenter wrote, and in December published, a science fiction novel, Versality. The story takes place largely in the metaverse called non.life, and concerns a dangerous, approaching interstellar object that causes profound changes, technological accelerations and new connections.

Personal life 
Carpenter has an interest in electronic music, creating tracks under the name muterial.

References

External links 
cleverbot.com
existor.com
The Personal Turing Test

jabberwacky.com
PopSci clip of Cleverbot
soundcloud.com/muterial
thoughtscreen.com
versality.com

British computer scientists
Artificial intelligence researchers
Living people
1965 births